Lien Yu-hui (born 19 June 1970) is a Taiwanese former professional tennis player.

Debuting in 1988, Lien's Davis Cup career spanned 10 years and he competed in a total of 19 ties, winning 20 rubbers overall. With victories in nine doubles rubbers, he is Chinese Taipei's most successful ever Davis Cup doubles player.

Lien played on the professional tour in the 1990s and reached a career high singles ranking of 527. He featured in his only ATP Tour main draw in 1992, at his home tournament in Taipei, falling in the first round to Brett Steven.

In 1996 he represented Chinese Taipei at the Atlanta Olympics, as partner of Chen Chih-jung in the doubles draw. They were beaten in the first round by Ivorian brothers Claude and Clement N'Goran.

References

External links
 
 
 

1970 births
Living people
Taiwanese male tennis players
Tennis players at the 1994 Asian Games
Asian Games competitors for Chinese Taipei
Tennis players at the 1996 Summer Olympics
Olympic tennis players of Taiwan
20th-century Taiwanese people